Justice League/Mighty Morphin Power Rangers was a 2017 comic book intercompany crossover series featuring DC Comics' Justice League and Saban's Power Rangers, written by Tom Taylor with art by Stephen Byrne, published by DC Comics and Boom Studios.

Plot

Lord Zedd attacks the Command Center with an army of Putties and Zack arrives to defend it and Zordon. During his attempt to teleport them out, the teleportation relay is destroyed by a fake Alpha 5 with a bomb implanted in him. This causes the teleportation to malfunction and send Zack, Lord Zedd and the Putties to cross dimensions, where a "Dark" and familiar figure witnesses their arrival. The Power Rangers teleport to the same coordinates Zack went to and end up stranded in the DC Universe, a world where superpowered heroes are an everyday thing and villains are almost as powerful as the  monsters  that Rita and Zedd create.

Shortly after arriving, the Power Rangers meet six members of the Justice League - Batman, Flash, Superman, Green Lantern, Cyborg, and Wonder Woman. As they ascertain the truth of what is going on, alerts come in from all over the world - of monster attacks. Lord Zedd has met Brainiac, and the two villains have forged an alliance together. Using creatures from Brainiac's bottle habitats, Lord Zedd has created six octopus-like monstrosities and unleashed them on every populated continent. To meet this new threat, the Rangers and Justice League members split up, with a Ranger joining the Justice League at each location. However, two unforeseen events take place - the teleporters aboard the Watchtower are hacked and sabotaged, and Brainiac drones infiltrate the Rangers' Zord vehicles, stealing their communicators and power coins before the vehicles teleport away.

As the Rangers mourn the loss of their powers (as well as their only way home), Billy hits upon an idea - using a Higgs-Boson collider to open a portal to the Power Ranger universe. With the help of the Justice League, the two teams succeed in traveling through, only to find a terrible scene before them. The true scope of the Zedd-Brainiac alliance is made manifest - in exchange for Brainiac's help in defeating the Power Rangers, Zedd has provided him with two things - first, Angel Grove is to become a part of Brainiac's collection of cities (from destroyed planets), and second, in exchange for shrinking Zordon and the Command Center, Brainiac will receive Alpha-5, the only other machine to achieve sentience.

Reception
The comic received mixed to  positive critical reviews.

On Comic Book Roundup, the critics review were 7.1/10, while the audience review was 7.3/10.

Publications
 Justice League/Mighty Morphin Power Rangers (2017-12-06 (hardcover), 2018-11-21 (softcover): Includes Justice League/Mighty Morphin Power Rangers #1-6.

References

External links
DC page

2016 comics debuts
Comics based on television series
Crossover comics
DC Comics titles
Boom! Studios titles
Power Rangers
Intercompany crossovers
Justice League titles
Comics about parallel universes